Miamisburg is a city in southern Montgomery County, Ohio, United States. The population was 19,923 at the 2020 census. A suburb of Dayton, it is part of the Dayton metropolitan area. Named after the Miami people, Miamisburg is known for its industrial history, particularly its nuclear operations during World War II, and retail factors such as the Dayton Mall and surrounding commercial business area.

History
European-Americans started calling their first community "Hole's Station" circa 1797, when Zechariah Hole settled there with his family from Virginia and built a stockade on the west bank of the Miami River opposite the mouth of Bear Creek. The stockade attracted squatters, surveying parties, and other settlers who had taken grants to live in the local cabins until they could build their own; hence the little community became known as "Hole's Station". Settlers came west primarily from Pennsylvania. Miamisburg was incorporated in 1832 as a village; it achieved city status in the 1920s.

By 1827, the Miami and Erie Canal was under construction through the community, which improved transportation of people and goods through the region. The formal opening took place in January 1829, when the Governor Brown was the first packet boat to go through the settlement. Also that year the first boats from Cincinnati had arrived and passed through Miamisburg to get to Dayton. By 1834 the canal had been extended to Piqua, and many businesses along the river grew. The 1840s and the 1850s were brought the best of times to the canals.

George Kinder, a local resident, shipped bags of food to Ireland during its Great Famine; these also contained his address, with ads saying that he was hiring immigrant workers. Some Irish immigrants did come to Miamisburg and surrounding cities in search of work.

Miamisburg was the site of one of the first post-war U.S Atomic Energy Commission (AEC) facilities, beginning in 1947. The Dayton area had supported numerous secret operations for the War Department during World War II. As the war ended, the majority of these operations were moved to the Miamisburg Mound Laboratory, which was operated by the Monsanto Chemical Company. The Mound Labs were to monitor all aspects of the US nuclear defense stockpile.

The workers, who numbered more than 2,000 at the height of the production, made plutonium detonators for nuclear weapons. Their work was very classified. The plant had a small army of security guards and was ringed by chain-link fencing and razor wire. When the Cold War ended, the plant discontinued the detonator work, but it continued to make nuclear power generators for space probes.

In May 1993 U.S. Department of Energy decided to end all production at the Mound. This move affected 2,100 employees in the local area. By 1996 cleanup of radioactive and hazardous waste was the main activity at the Plant. The Mound Development Corporation spearheaded the creation of the Mound Advanced Technology Center in the redevelopment of the plant, with the Montgomery County Regional Dispatch Center joining 14 other tenants in March 2009. In December 2010, the Dayton Police Department became the 17th law enforcement agency, along with 11 fire departments, to be dispatched from the regional center.

On September 10, 1978, 15 cars of a Conrail freight train derailed as the result of a hot box, caused by uneven distribution of steel ingots in a gondola loaded at Buffalo, New York by Republic Steel. They demolished a house at the Pearl Street crossing and killed three of its five occupants. As a result of a cooperative investigation by the Miamisburg Police Department and the National Transportation Safety Board, the deaths were ruled homicides by the Montgomery County Coroner.

Eight years later the city was the site of the July 8, 1986 derailment of 15 cars of a Baltimore and Ohio Railroad train, resulting in explosions of tank cars, emitted gas and clouds from phosphorus, on two successive days. The resulting thick white cloud engulfed communities as far north as Yellow Springs, Pitchin, and South Vienna.  Rolling in like a massive desert dust storm across the horizon, the chemical cloud hugged the ground and blotted out the sun for several minutes before dissipating, according to the National Transportation Safety Board’s report. The explosions led to the evacuation of an estimated 25,000 to 40,000 residents from Miamisburg and surrounding southern Montgomery County municipalities, at the time this was the largest evacuation in U.S. history resulting from a train accident, according to William E. Loftus, executive director of the Federal Railroad Administration. This was also the largest evacuation in Ohio history.

A nitric oxide distillation column at a local chemical plant known as Isotec exploded on September 21, 2003, causing school and other events to be cancelled. Isotec is a division of Sigma-Aldrich.

World headquarters of JatroDiesel is in Miamisburg. JatroDiesel manufactures biodiesel equipment and produces biodiesel, a sustainable alternative fuel to diesel. The headquarters of National City Mortgage Corporation, a division of National City Corp. was in Miamisburg. In 2009, PNC Bank purchased National City Bank and converted National City Mortgage into PNC Mortgage. The headquarters for PNC Mortgage moved to Downers Grove, Ill, but much of the servicing division remains in Miamisburg. World headquarters of LexisNexis were in Miamisburg. In 2007, the headquarters moved to New York City, but the operations have remained in Ohio.

In 2018, a time vault was opened to celebrate the city's 200th birthday.

Mound 

Miamisburg is the location of a prehistoric Indian burial mound (tumulus), believed to have been built by the Adena culture, about 1000 to 200 BCE. Once serving as an ancient burial site, the mound has become perhaps the most recognizable historic landmark in Miamisburg. In a city park at 900 Mound Avenue, it has been designated an Ohio historical site. It is picnic destination and tourist attraction. Visitors can climb to the top of the Mound, via the 116 concrete steps built into its side. It is at coordinates .

Geography

Climate

The climate of Miamisburg and the surrounding region is dominated by a humid-continental climate, characterized by hot, muggy summers and cold, dry winters. Miamisburg is prone to severe weather because of its location in the Midwestern section of the United States. Tornadoes are possible from spring to fall. Floods, blizzards, and severe thunderstorms can also occur.

Miamisburg has suffered some natural disasters. On June 9, 1869, a tornado struck the northwest part of town, reportedly destroying roofs and chimneys, as well as uprooting trees. It also destroyed Linden Avenue Bridge. Blizzards struck the town in 1978, 2004, and 2008.

In 1913, the Great Dayton Flood destroyed much of the city. Not much precipitation is needed to flood locations such as Rice Field(s), which is on the banks of the Great Miami River.

Demographics

2010 census
As of the census of 2010, there were 20,181 people, 7,948 households, and 5,570 families residing in the city. The racial makeup of the city was 93.8% White, 3.0% African American, 0.2% Native American, 1.0% Asian, 0.4% from other races, and 1.5% from two or more races. Hispanic or Latino of any race were 1.6% of the population.

Out of a total of 7,948 households, 35.0% had children under the age of 18 living with them, 53.7% were married couples living together, 12.0% had a female householder with no husband present, 4.4% had a male householder with no wife present, and 29.9% were non-families. 25.4% of all households were made up of individuals, and 11.5% had someone living alone who was 65 years of age or older. The average household size was 2.50 and the average family size was 2.98.

The median age in the city was 40.2 years. 25.1% of residents were under the age of 18; 6.4% were between the ages of 18 and 24; 25% were from 25 to 44; 27.2% were from 45 to 64; and 16.2% were 65 years of age or older. The gender makeup of the city was 47.6% male and 52.4% female.

2000 census
As of the census of 2000, there were 19,489 people, 7,449 households, and 5,393 families residing in the city. The population density was 1,741.6 people per square mile (672.5/km2). There were 7,905 housing units at an average density of 706.4 per square mile (272.8/km2). The racial makeup of the city was 95% White, 1.6% African American, 0.13% Native American, 0.73% Asian, 0.04% Pacific Islander, 0.3% from other races, and 1.29% from two or more races. Hispanic or Latino of any race were 0.85% of the population.

There were 7,449 households, out of which 35.0% had children under the age of 18 living with them, 58.2% were married couples living together, 10.6% had a female householder with no husband present, and 27.6% were non-families. 23.3% of all households were made up of individuals, and 9.6% had someone living alone who was 65 years of age or older. The average household size was 2.53 and the average family size was 3.00.

In the city, the population was spread out, with 25.9% under the age of 18, 7.1% from 18 to 24, 29.3% from 25 to 44, 22.4% from 45 to 64, and 15.3% who were 65 years of age or older. The median age was 38 years. For every 100 females, there were 92.2 males. For every 100 females age 18 and over, there were 87.7 males.

The median income for a household in the city was $48,316, and the median income for a family was $56,996. Males had a median income of $41,918 versus $28,045 for females. The per capita income for the city was $22,504. About 4.6% of families and 6.1% of the population were below the poverty line, including 7.3% of those under age 18 and 7.7% of those age 65 or over.

Economy

Motoman, Verso Corporation and Dayton Superior are headquartered in Miamisburg.

Top employers
According to Miamisburg's 2021 Annual Comprehensive Financial Report, the top employers in the city are:

Culture and recreation

The city's downtown area is home to many small stores and historic buildings. Several restaurants are also there including the original TJ Chumps, and other local and national chain restaurants. The Hamburger Wagon is on Market Square. Other historical buildings downtown include the Baum Opera House, Gebhart Tavern, and Library Park.

Architecture
Due to the growth of the city in the 19th century, many of the older houses in the city are Victorian-style homes. They are concentrated in the neighborhood of "Old Miamisburg" (downtown and riverfront areas). Other architectural styles include Queen Anne, Italianate, and Second Empire-styled buildings. Much of Miami Township has residential housing of single-family homes, which were built during the expanded suburban development typical of the late 20th century, especially the 1970s through the 1990s. Newer houses have been built in the 21st century as some residents have sought higher-priced luxury homes, evidenced in new developments such as Pipestone, Crains Run, Heincke Woods, and Bear Creek.

To encourage and recognize Miamisburg citizens for maintaining the aesthetic appearance (tidiness, landscaping) of their property, the City Beautification Commission selects a number of "City Beautiful Awards" each July, August, and September for both residential and commercial properties. Additionally, the City Beautification Commission also offers awards for high-quality architectural renovation projects and for a number of holiday decoration displays in December.

Annual events
Numerous community events are held during the year, such as live music and block parties. Every spring, 'Spring Break in the Burg' and the 'Spring Fling' festival is held downtown in Library Park. On Halloween, 'Boo in the Burg' offers special shopping and food specials for patrons. An annual bicycle race known as 'Tour D'Burg' is also held every summer in the downtown area.

Other annual events include:
 Miamisburg Starving Artists (Open air arts and craft show)
 Christmas Starving Artists (November indoor arts and craft show)
 Miamisburg Turkey Trot (Thanksgiving Day 8K Run/Walk)
 Cruise The Burg (auto show)
 Thunderburg Motorcycle Show

Government
Miamisburg is governed by council–manager government with a seven-member city council and a city manager, who is hired by council. Four members of city council represent their respective wards and three members are at-large. The city also has an elected mayor who largely fills a ceremonial role. While the mayor sits on council he or she votes only in the event of a tie.

Education

Public education in Miamisburg is provided by the Miamisburg City School District. The superintendent for the district is Dr. Laura Blessing (2020-present). Miamisburg has 6 K-5 buildings, and one PreK - 5th building (Medlar View Elementary School) The schools, and the years they were built are located below in parentheses. :

 Bauer Elementary School (1967)
 Bear Elementary School (1952)
 Jane Chance Elementary School (2010)
 Kinder Elementary School (1906, 2012 reconstruction)
 Maddux-Lang Primary School (2008)
 Mark Twain Elementary School (1950)
 Medlar View Elementary School (1999)
 Miamisburg High School (1972)
 Miamisburg Middle School (2011)
 Mound Elementary School (1955)

Miamisburg is ranked third in the Dayton Area for the best academic rate scores. Miamisburg has won the "Excellent District Award" in 2002, 2003, 2004, 2005, 2006, 2007, 2008, 2010, and 2011. For 2012, the district has been awarded the coveted "Excellent with Distinction" status. Miamisburg High School was recognized as a National Blue Ribbon School of Excellence in 1997. Both Wantz Middle School (closed; 2011) and Kinder Elementary were awarded Blue Ribbon Awards in the early 21st century.

After three failed attempts, voters passed a US$78.5 million bond issue on March 4, 2008. The bond issued raised $23 million for a large-scale addition and renovation project at Miamisburg High School and $31 million for the construction of Miamisburg Middle School, grades 6–8, which opened in August 2011. In addition, the bond issue included $11 million for Jane Chance Elementary School, the district's seventh K-5 facility, which opened in August 2010. Also included was $11 million for an addition/renovation project at historic Kinder Elementary School and $4 million in various improvements to Bauer, Bear, Mark Twain, and Mound elementary schools, including renovated administration spaces, enhanced security and safety features, as well as a project at Mound Elementary School for a new playground, student drop-off area, and redesigned parking lots.

Unrelated to the March 2008 bond issue but constructed simultaneously is Maddux-Lang Primary School, on the campus of Jane Chance Elementary School at Wood and Crains Run roads. Maddux-Lang, the district's $2 million preschool facility, was funded entirely through Transportation District Improvement funds related to the new Austin Boulevard interchange.

In addition to the public school district in Miamisburg, the city is also the home to the West Campus of Bishop Leibold School, a private catholic school named after Paul Francis Leibold. The West Campus of Bishop Leibold School deals with preschool through the third grade, while its East Campus in Miami Township deals with the fourth grade through the eight grade. Bishop Leibold School was awarded the National Blue Ribbon Award in 2008. Bishop Leibold has also been working to improve its STEM education and as a result has been awarded along with its teachers the Governor's Thomas Edison Award for Excellence in STEM Education four school years in a row (2010-2014). In its most recent school year for receiving the award (2013-2014) it was the only Dayton-area grade school to be recognized.

Miamisburg has a public library, a branch of the Dayton Metro Library.

Media
Miamisburg is in the circulation area of the Dayton Daily News, and it publishes the Miamisburg/West Carrollton News. The city has a local radio station, WFCJ 93.7 – Christian (WFJC Inspiration).

Transportation
Miamisburg is part of the Greater Dayton Regional Transit Authority, which has many bus routes throughout the city.

CSX and Norfolk Southern provide freight railway services. CSX passes near Miamisburg on the west side of the Great Miami River, and Norfolk Southern's line runs through downtown.

Sister city
Miamisburg's sister city is Owen Sound, Ontario.

Notable people 
 Vincent G. Apple (1874-1932), inventor
 Helen Vickroy Austin (1829–1921), journalist, horticulturist
 The McGuire Sisters - 20th century female trio
 David Bruton - professional football player in the National Football League (NFL), 2009–2016
 Ebby DeWeese - professional football player in the NFL, 1927–1930
 Jeffrey Edward Fowle - arrested in North Korea in May 2014 on unspecified charges
 George Kinderdine - professional football player in the Ohio League and NFL, 1915, 1917–1929
 Shine Kinderdine – professional football player in the NFL, 1924
 Josh Myers - professional football player in the NFL, 2021–present
 Lou Partlow - professional football player in the Ohio League and NFL, 1915–1927, and first to score an official touchdown in NFL history

Communities

References

External links

 City of Miamisburg
 South Metro Regional Chamber of Commerce

 
Cities in Ohio
Cities in Montgomery County, Ohio
1797 establishments in the Northwest Territory